Churchill Falls is a  high waterfall on the Churchill River in Labrador, Canada. Formerly counted among the most impressive natural features of Canada, the diversion of the river for the Churchill Falls Generating Station has cut off almost all of the falls' former flow, leaving a small stream winding through its old bed and trickling down the rocks.

Names
The Innu had a separate name for the falls, Patshishetshuanau ("Place where the Current Makes Clouds"). Captain William Martin's 1821 renaming of the river after Labrador's colonial governor Charles Hamilton gradually became more common but the falls continued to be known as the "Grand Falls" or less often as the  On 1 February 1965, the provincial premier Joey Smallwood renamed the river and the falls after the former British prime minister Winston Churchill ahead of approving its large hydroelectric project.

History
The falls were a significant landmark for local Indigenous peoples. The Innu believed that to look on these awe-inspiring falls meant death and maintained a strong taboo against visiting into the early 20th century.

In 1839, a team led by Scoto-Canadian trader John McLeanseeking a navigable route between Fort Chimo in northwest Labrador and Fort Smith on Lake Melville in southeast Labrador for the Hudson's Bay Companywere the first Europeans to discover the area. McLean was mostly annoyed that the falls presented an obstacle to a direct river route and meant retracing his path back north, but he was still overwhelmed by the falls' majesty.

Fifty years later, the unmapped falls were sought as part of an 1891 scientific expedition to Labrador consisting of alumni and faculty from Bowdoin College in Maine.  On July 26 a four-man party embarked in canoes heading westward from the expedition's schooner Julia Decker, but injury forced two of them to turn back.  Austin Cary and Dennis Cole continued onward; after a 300 mile trek they reached the falls by foot on August 13.

In 1894, Albert Peter Low of Canada's Geological Survey reached the falls.

Plans were made as early as 1915 to divert the river above the falls for power generation, but they were abandoned as unfeasible at the time. Following the development of the iron ore mines in western Labrador and the construction of the Quebec North Shore and Labrador Railway in 1954, the project became workable and surveys and planning began. The Churchill Falls Generating Station started construction in 1967 and, in 1970, almost all of the Churchill's water was diverted into a reservoir upstream of the falls. Only a small stream remains; even when the reservoir hits its maximum water levels, usually a once-a-decade event, the controlled release over the falls amounts to only about 10% of the falls' former flow.

Legacy
The nearby company town of Churchill Falls is named for the falls.

See also
 Lists of waterfalls by type, height, and flow rate

References

Bibliography
 .

External links

 
Waterfalls of Newfoundland and Labrador
Labrador